Recover is the fourth studio album by New Zealand indie electronic band The Naked and Famous, released on 24 July 2020 by Somewhat Damaged and AWAL.

Background
"Sunseeker" was released on 8 November 2019 as the lead single from the band's then-upcoming fourth album, along with an accompanying music video. Shore Fire Media stated that the two band members, Thomas Powers and Alisa Xayalith, "embrace transformation whilst remaining authentically true to form on the new single".

On 16 January 2020, "Bury Us" was released as the album's second single. Puah Ziwei of NME stated that the song "captures the energy and essence of their forthcoming record". Laura Johnson of Stereoboard referred to the song as "a club-ready indie-pop track with thoughtful lyrics".

"Come as You Are" was released as the album's third single on 26 February 2020, followed by "Death" on 22 May 2020. The title track was serviced to Australian radio on 24 July 2020 as the fifth single.

Critical reception

Heran Mamo of Billboard stated that the album has a "main theme of human survival and self-preservation, especially at the hands of another person who could bring you down". Matt Collar of AllMusic described the music as "turning feelings of heartbreak and desire into powerfully relatable pop moments".

Track listing

Notes
  signifies an additional producer

Personnel
Credits adapted from the liner notes of Recover.

Performers

 Morgxn – backing vocals 
 Chelsea Jade – backing vocals 
 Luna Shadows – backing vocals 
 Dani Poppitt – backing vocals 
 Simon Oscroft – backing vocals 
 In.Drip. – backing vocals

Technical

 Thom Powers – production 
 Simon Oscroft – production ; additional production 
 Ryan Shanahan – mixing ; production 
 Joe LaPorta – mastering 
 Luna Shadows – additional production ; production ; vocal engineering 
 Sam McCarthy – production 
 Sombear – additional production 
 Alisa Xayalith – production 
 Tyler Spry – production 
 Dave Trumfio – additional engineering, recording

Charts

References

2020 albums
The Naked and Famous albums